Groucho Marx (1890–1977) was an American comedian

Groucho could also refer to:

 Groucho: A Life in Revue, a musical revue about the life of the comedian
 Groucho Club, a private arts club in London
 Groucho, a supporting character in the comic book series Dylan Dog
 Groucho, a transcription-inhibiting factor in genetics
 Groucho is an enemy which resembles Groucho Marx's face from the Japanese game Mother.

See also
Oscar the Grouch, Muppet character on Sesame Street TV program